Miandar (also Romanized as Mīāndar) is a village in Byaban Rural District, Byaban District, Minab County, Hormozgan Province, Iran. At the 2006 census, its population was 55, in 7 families.

References 

Populated places in Minab County